Alfred Baker (1848 – October 27, 1942) was a Canadian academic. A Fellow of the Royal Society of Canada, he was its president from 1915 to 1916.

Biography
Born in Toronto, of Yorkshire parents, Baker was educated at the Toronto Grammar School and University of Toronto. He was appointed a mathematical tutor in University College, University of Toronto in 1875 and was a registrar in 1880. Baker was a professor of mathematics at the University of Toronto and was chair of mathematics from 1887 until 1919.

References

1848 births
1942 deaths
Fellows of the Royal Society of Canada
University of Toronto alumni
Academic staff of the University of Toronto